Frank Bissell (1878-1970) was an American politician from Iowa.

Frank Bissell was born on the family farm in Cass County, Iowa on 12 January 1878. He was a farmer and laborer until June 1905, when he moved to Dexter, Iowa, and began working in agricultural real estate. He was elected to a single term on the Iowa Senate in 1928, as a Republican representing District 17, which at the time included Dallas, Guthrie and Audubon counties. After serving as a state senator for four years, he moved to Creston in 1936, and later retired from real estate. He died at Friendship Manor, a nursing home in Grinnell, on 23 June 1970.

References

1878 births
Republican Party Iowa state senators
People from Creston, Iowa
People from Dallas County, Iowa
1970 deaths
20th-century American politicians
American real estate brokers
Farmers from Iowa
People from Cass County, Iowa